The 2017–18 Saint Louis Billikens men's basketball team represented Saint Louis University in the 2017–18 NCAA Division I men's basketball season. Their head coach was Travis Ford in his second season at Saint Louis. The team played their home games at Chaifetz Arena as a member of the Atlantic 10 Conference. They finished the season 17–16, 9–9 in A-10 play to finish in a four-way tie for fifth place. As the No. 6 seed in the A-10 tournament, they defeated George Washington in the second round before losing to Davidson in the quarterfinals.

Previous season 
The Billikens finished the 2016–17 season 11–21, 5–13 in A-10 play to finish in 11th place. They received the No. 11 seed in the A-10 tournament where they defeated Duquesne in the first round to advance to the second round where they lost to George Washington.

Offseason

Departures

Incoming transfers

2017 recruiting class

2018 recruiting class

Preseason
In a poll of the league's head coaches and select media members at the conference's media day, the Billikens were picked to finish in seventh place in the A-10.

Title IX Investigation
On September 24, 2017, three women alleged sexual assault by four players. A Title IX investigation was opened on September 26, 2017. When exhibition season opened and during the season, Ty Graves, Adonys Henriquez and Jermaine Bishop were not on the bench during games and the team plays with eight scholarship players. January 19, 2018 the university announces that the four players were informed of the Title IX findings and given suspensions ranging from 18 to 24 months, with one player being expelled. The players appeal the decision and the team continues to play with the same roster as the start of the season. February 6, 2013, Graves announced he was leaving the school and it is reported that Henriquez signed with an agent  and that Jermaine Bishop had practiced through the end of the week. February 13, 2018, the university announces it has concluded its Title IX investigation and all parties have been notified of the final decisions, which were determined by the Appeal Panel. Jordan Goodwin was suspended for the remainder of the season and was no longer enrolled in the school as he was found to be in violation of university policy. February 15, 2018, Graves announces he is transferring to North Carolina Central University. March 1, 2018, Club San Lazaro of the Dominican Republic announced they have signed Henriquez to a professional contract. May 22, 2018, Goodwin re-enrolled at SLU. June 6, 2018, Bishop announced he was transferring to Norfolk State.

Roster

Source

Schedule and results

|-
!colspan=9 style=| Exhibition

|-
!colspan=9 style=|Regular season

|-
!colspan=12 style=| A-10 regular season

|-
!colspan=9 style=| A-10 tournament

References

Saint Louis
Saint Louis Billikens men's basketball seasons
Saint
Saint